Yuri Dmitriyevich Sarantsev (7 October 1928 – 24 August 2005) was a Soviet and Russian actor who appeared in numerous films between 1950 and 1999. He is most known for the 1962 sci-fi film Planeta Bur. He was also an accomplished voice actor, most famous for providing the voice for Ostap Bender in The Twelve Chairs (1971). People's Artist of Russia (2000).

Filmography
The Village Doctor (1951) – cook (uncredited)
True Friends (1954) – Seryozha
Road to Life (1955) – Grisha Burun
Good Morning (1955) – Vasya Plotnikov
Different Fortunes (1956) – Galkin
A Snow Fairy Tale (1959) – chauffeur's voice (played by Mikhail Pugovkin)
Thrice Resurrected (1960) – Anton's voice (played by Gennady Pavlov)
Planeta Bur (1962) – Ivan Shcherba
Come Tomorrow, Please... (1963) – Kostya's voice (played by Yuri Gorobets)
The Hyperboloid of Engineer Garin (1965) – Tarashkin
Voyage to the Prehistoric Planet (1965) – Allen Sherman (uncredited; in original movie as Shcherba)
Thirty Three (1965) – toothless taxi driver
Little Fugitive (1966) – captain's assistant
Give a Paw, Friend! (1967) – foreman of animal control service
The Shield and the Sword (1968) – Gustav's voice (played by Ernst-Georg Schwill)
Crime and Punishment (1969) – lieutenant Ilya Petrovich "Gunpowder"
The Twelve Chairs (1971) – Ostap Bender's voice (played by Archil Gomiashvili)
Train Stop – Two Minutes (1972) – Vlas Petrovich
Only "Old Men" Are Going Into Battle (1973) – Vasily Vasilyevich
Talents and Admirers (1973) – Gavrilo Petrovich Migaev
You to Me, Me to You (1976) – Sergei Kashkin's voice (played by Leonid Kuravlyov)
The Throw, or Everything Started on Saturday (1976) – Temirbek Sarsenbaev's voice (played by Yesbolgan Zhaisanbaev)
Armed and Dangerous (1977) – Starbottle's voice (played by Algimantas Masiulis)
Balamut (1978) – Aleksei Ivanovich
Aquanauts (1979) – Selivanov
Borrowing Matchsticks (1980) – Ville Huttunen's voice (played by Olavi Ahonen)
Sailors Have No Questions (1980) – Alya's father
Could One Imagine? (1981) – taxi driver's voice (played by Vladimir Prikhodko)
Demidovs (1983) – voivode
A Cruel Romance (1984) – Mikhin
Sohni Mahiwal (1984) – warrior's voice in Soviet dub (played by Frunzik Mkrtchyan)
One Second for a Feat (1985) – Romanenko
Love with Privileges (1989) – Dr. Nikolai Yevgenyevich Kondakov
The Return of the Battleship (1996) – janitor
Red Square (2004) – Konstantin Chernenko

Awards and honors 

 Order of the Badge of Honour (1976)
Honored Artist of the RSFSR (1981)
 Medal "Veteran of Labour" (1984)
 Medal "In Commemoration of the 850th Anniversary of Moscow" (1997)
 People's Artist of Russia (2000)

References

External links

1928 births
2005 deaths
20th-century Russian male actors
21st-century Russian male actors
People from Saratov Oblast
Gerasimov Institute of Cinematography alumni
Honored Artists of the RSFSR
People's Artists of Russia
Russian male film actors
Russian male voice actors

Soviet male film actors
Soviet male voice actors